This article provides a summary of results for the general elections to the Canadian territory of Yukon's unicameral legislative body, the Yukon Legislative Assembly, formerly the Yukon Territorial Council. The number of members in the Yukon assembly has increased over time, from six appointed members in the late 1800s, to eight (only two elected) in Yukon's first election in 1900, to the current nineteen (all elected).

From 1898 to 1978, the legislative body in Yukon was the Yukon Territorial Council. This body did not act as the primary government, but was a non-partisan advisory body to the Commissioner of the Yukon. At the beginning it did not have law-making ability and was composed of appointed members or mixture of appointed and elected members.

Political parties were used on some pre-1920 elections but then fell out of use. Parties were introduced in 1978, when the Yukon Legislative Assembly was established.

Yukon used multi-member districts during part of its early history. In 1903 and from 1909 to 1920, two members were elected at a time in all or some of its districts. Other times it used single-member districts.

Since 1978, each riding (electoral district) has elected one member by first past the post to the Yukon Legislative Assembly. Political parties were officially recognized and registered beginning in 1978. Yukon is the only Canadian territory to have a partisan legislature.

The chart on the right shows the information graphically, with the most recent elections on the right (going as far back as the introduction of political parties in 1978). The Yukon Party (which was named the Yukon Progressive Conservative Party prior to 1992) has been the most successful since political parties were officially recognised, having won six out of ten elections. The NDP have won three elections, and the Liberal party have won two elections.

1978–present

Summary of results
The table below shows the total number of seats won by the major political parties at each election. It also shows the percentage of the vote obtained by the major political parties at each election. The winning party's total's are shown in bold. There have been two elections (in 1985 and 2021) where the party that formed the government did not have the largest share of the vote. Full details on any election are linked via the year of the election at the start of the row.

Note
 Changed its name from Yukon Progressive Conservative Party to the Yukon Party prior to the 1992 election.

Number of candidates

1900–74 
There were no territorial parties in the Yukon before 1978. From the territory's creation in 1898 until 1978, the Yukon was governed by a federally appointed Commissioner advised by the Territorial Council. The Territorial council was wholly appointed from 1898 to 1900; part elected, part appointed from 1900 to 1908; and wholly elected from 1909 to 1978.

The number of members varied considerably during the council's 80-year history. The 1900 election elected just two out of eight members; the elections from 1903 to 1907 elected five out of ten members. The wholly elected Council comprised ten members from 1909, which was reduced to three starting with the 1920 election. The number of members was increased to five as of the 1952 election, seven as of the 1961 election, and twelve for the final general election to the Council in 1974.

 1900 Yukon general election
 1903 Yukon general election
 1905 Yukon general election
 1907 Yukon general election
 1909 Yukon general election
 1912 Yukon general election
 1915 Yukon general election
 1917 Yukon general election
 1920 Yukon general election
 1922 Yukon general election
 1925 Yukon general election
 1928 Yukon general election
 1931 Yukon general election
 1934 Yukon general election
 1937 Yukon general election
 1940 Yukon general election
 1944 Yukon general election
 1947 Yukon general election
 1949 Yukon general election
 1952 Yukon general election
 1955 Yukon general election
 1958 Yukon general election
 1961 Yukon general election
 1964 Yukon general election
 1967 Yukon general election
 1970 Yukon general election
 1974 Yukon general election

References

Bibliography
  (Results)
  (Dates; numbers of candidates/members)
 

 
Yukon general elections
Elections